Newcastle Great Park is a new suburb in the north of Newcastle upon Tyne, England. Much of Newcastle Great Park is still under development and is sandwiched in between older areas of Newcastle, namely Gosforth, Fawdon and Kingston Park to the south, and Hazlerigg to the north. Newcastle Great Park is the largest housing development in the North East of England.

History 
Development of this area, Newcastle City Council's 'Northern Development Area' had been in planning since at least 1991. In the 1990s the plans consisted of 2,500 houses and a 200-acre business and industrial development which could provide up to 10,000 jobs. Current indicative phasing shows plans for 3,300+ homes by 2030 and 4,100+ beyond 2030.

 

Prior to the area becoming a large housing and business development, the area to the north of the Great Park development was Hazlerigg Colliery. After the colliery closed the land it stood on was redeveloped into Havannah Nature Reserve. Fawdon Wagonway served the local collieries during the 19th century; the Wagonway lends its name to a street in the new development and part of the wagonway's route is still in existence as a public footpath.

Development 
The Newcastle Great Park development is 15 years into a 30+ year building project. Estates within the Great Park include:

 Brunton Grange (phases 1, 2 & 3)
 Brunton Green
 Brunton Meadows
 Brunton Village
 Brunton West
 East Moor Village
 Elmwood Park Court
 Elmwood Park Gardens
 Elmwood Park Green
 Elmwood Park View
 Greenside
 Melbury
 Warkworth Woods
 West Heath

Housing is currently under development by Charles Church, Persimmon Homes and Taylor Wimpey. Great Park town centre is under construction near Brunton Lane to the west of the A1. According to Newcastle City Council the town centre will include a supermarket, high street style shops, cafés, restaurants, a hotel, nursing home, private hospital and leisure facilities.

Housing numbers 
House building in Great Park started in 2001 on the Warkworth Woods development shortly followed by Melbury in 2002. The table below shows current and planned housing numbers, in date order, up to 2030:

Education 
Newcastle Great Park contains one first school, Brunton First School, and as Newcastle operates a three tier education system older students feed into Gosforth Junior High Academy and on to Gosforth Academy. Brunton First School opened in September 2009.

In 2015 the academy unveiled a bid to build an additional 1,200-place secondary school in Newcastle Great Park as potential plan to meet the demand for school places from the expanding residential community in the area.  The Secretary of State for Education confirmed the proposal to build a school as part of the Gosforth Academy federation at the Great Park in Cell A with an intended opening date of September 2020. Formal approval of a first school providing spaces for 450 pupils and a middle/secondary school for up to 1,700 pupils was granted by Newcastle City Council in October 2019.  The Great Park Academy (GPA) has been delayed due a judicial review process which wildlife campaigners lost in February 2020.  The new schools are now expected to open in September 2022 and contingency measures, including 'bulge classes' at existing schools, are being implemented to provide for pupils.

Business

Sage 

The software company Sage Group had their world headquarters in Newcastle Great Park between 2004 and 2021. Sage Group's building, named North Park, was one of the first occupants of Newcastle Great Park in 2004 as Sage moved their Newcastle-based staff into a single building for the first time having previously been spread between two buildings on Benton Park Road and also in Horsley House in Regent Centre. As of 2021 Sage's building in Great Park is vacant and up for sale/lease.

Sage's  building housing approximately 1500 employees was built at a cost of £57 million. The building was worked on by Cundall, Tolent and idpartnership architects, and required the use of the largest mobile crane in the country at the time of construction. The building was shortlisted for the British Council for Offices Awards (2005 - Corporate Workplace Project) and was the runner up for the Landmark Awards (2005 - Office Development).

During the planning stages Sage's building was initially earmarked for Cell B of the development before switching to Cell C; moving further from the A1 road. The building was designed to be built in two phases and able to house up to 3000 members of staff, however this expansion did not occur.

In 2019 Sage announced their intention to move their Newcastle office out of their North Park headquarters building and into the Cobalt Business Park, the UK's largest business park, signing a 15-year lease starting 2020/2021.

Esh Plaza 

Esh Plaza is a business office development consisting of two buildings that includes the headquarters of Bede Gaming – previous occupants included the Credit Services Association and the NHS.

Shopping 
A Londis shop, which opened on Featherstone Grove in March 2011, was the first store in the Melbury estate (this changed to a Premier Express shop known as 'The Great Park Store'), but this has since closed.

A pharmacy is open in the town centre area. In July 2021 a branch of One Stop opened in Middleton South in the Town Centre.

 a Morrisons supermarket is currently in planning.

A dental practice opened in the town centre in August 2022 on the site of Middleton North.

Community 
The Great Park Community Centre, based on Roseden Way, opened in March 2014 and provides a range of services and facilities to the local community including:

 A main hall that can seat up to 100 people
 The main hall can be split into 3 smaller spaces
 Meeting room for up to 14 people
 Kitchen facilities
 2 x Sports England standard football pitches
 Floodlit courts including:
 2 x floodlit tennis courts
 Netball court
 Basketball court
 2 x 5-a-side pitches

A wide range of activities run from the centre including A Church of England group, Pilates, Children's Dance, Drama Sessions, Martial Arts, Girl Guides, Summer Camps, Free Play and more.

Transport

Air

Bus
Newcastle Great Park is served by bus routes 46 (operated by Arriva North East) and Quaylink Q3 (operated by Go North East).

The 46 links Haymarket Bus Station with Gosforth, Regent Centre and Featherstone Grove (Melbury). The route operates up to every 15 minutes during the day (Monday to Saturday), and hourly on Sunday.

The Quaylink Q3 links Wallsend, Walker, Ouseburn and Quayside with Haymarket Bus Station, Gosforth, Regent Centre, Great Park Park and Ride and Great Park Village. The route operates up to every 15 minutes during the day (Monday to Saturday), and half-hourly during the evening and on Sunday.

Rail
The closest Tyne and Wear Metro stations to Newcastle Great Park are located at Fawdon and Kingston Park, with Newcastle Central being the closest National Rail station.

Road
Newcastle Great Park is situated on the A1 road, to the north of Newcastle.

Cycle Paths/Road
Cycling is via a dedicated partially segregated cycle route from Newcastle City Centre. 
However, there is then no dedicated cycle path along the busy Broadway West artery from the Great North Road to the A1 and on to Greenside and Great Park (only a very partially segregated path near Fawdon and over the A1 then winding round to Kingston Park, but not great for commuters or in winter when this is very quiet and dark, and nothing along Kingston Park Road). However a dedicated, segregated route is being campaigned for currently. Local people are signing a new Cycle Lane for Broadway West petition to reduce congestion and improve safety.

References

External links 
 Newcastle Great Park Action Group
 Newcastle Great Park
 Newcastle Great Park Community Centre
 One Core Strategy 2030 Consultation Site
 Kay's Geography Great Park page

Notes 

Great Park